Remy Christopher Gardner (born 24 February 1998) is an Australian motorcycle racer, best known for winning the 2021 Moto2 World Championship with Red Bull KTM Ajo. He is the son of 1987 premier class world champion, Wayne Gardner.

Career

Moto3 World Championship 
Gardner made his first three appearances in the Moto3 World Championship in 2014, twice as replacement for injured riders and once as a wild card entry, scoring one point in Malaysia.

In 2015 he was signed as a full-time rider for the Mahindra-equipped CIP team, riding next to Tatsuki Suzuki. Gardner achieved his best result, his only point scoring finish of the year, in his home GP at Phillip Island with a 10th place finish.

Moto2 World Championship

Tasca Racing Scuderia Moto2 (2016) 
For 2016, Gardner was due to compete in the Moto2 class with AGP Racing aboard a Suter alongside Federico Fuligni, but the team withdrew from the championship. He started the season in the Moto2 European Championship, winning a race in Barcelona, and mid-season made his debut in the Moto2 World Championship in Catalunya aboard Tasca Racing's Kalex as the substitute for Alessandro Tonucci. Gardner scored his first point in the class in his first race, and was kept for the remainder of the season, as Tonucci had no points in 6 races. Gardner scored points in three races, collecting eight points in the season, and earning himself a full time ride for 2017.

Tech3 Racing (2017–2018) 
For 2017, Gardner switched to Tech 3 Racing, partnering Spaniard Xavi Vierge. Gardner crashed out on the first lap in both of the opening two rounds in Qatar and Argentina, and was ruled out of the following round in Austin, being replaced by Julián Simón. Gardner would come back and improve steadily throughout the season however, picking up his first points of the season in Mugello with a 14th-place finish, and he also picked up points at the Sachsenring, Brno, the Red Bull Ring, Misano, Motegi, and Phillip Island. He finished in 21st place in the riders' championship, scoring 23 points.

In 2018, he remained with Tech 3, this time joined by Bo Bendsneyder, who moved up from Moto3. In the first half the season, Gardner suffered two broken legs and an ankle in a training accident and was replaced by Héctor Garzó for the rounds in Jerez, Le Mans, and Mugello. At Silverstone, Gardner achieved his first front row start in the Moto2 class, however due to heavy rain on race day, all races that weekend were cancelled due to unsafe track conditions after resurfacing. At Valencia, the last race of the season, Gardner scored his best ever result in the Moto2 class with a 5th place finish, and he finished 19th in the riders' championship, scoring 40 points.

Onexox TKKR SAG Team (2019–2020) 
For 2019, Tech 3 decided to replace Gardner and Bendsneyder with Marco Bezzecchi and Philipp Öttl. In October 2018, it was announced that Gardner would join SAG Team, joining Tetsuta Nagashima. Gardner started the season really well, finishing 4th in the opening round at Qatar, and scoring his first podium in Moto2 with a 2nd place finish in Argentina the next race weekend. Gardner finished the season 15th in the standings with 77 points, once again improving his tally from previous years, and just one point back from teammate Nagashima.

In the 2020 Moto2 World Championship, Gardner would be paired by Kasma Daniel, after Nagashima left to join Red Bull KTM Ajo. Gardner once again steadily improved, collecting 135 points total, finishing third in Austria, second in France, and third in Valencia, before winning the last race of the season in Portugal, his first victory in the Moto2 category. His teammate Daniel scored no points during the season, and Gardner finished 44 points ahead of ex-teammate Nagashima, who he would eventually replace at the Red Bull KTM Ajo team for 2021.

Red Bull KTM Ajo (2021) 
Following Jorge Martín's graduation to MotoGP, and Tetsuta Nagashima's disappointing season, for the 2021 Moto2 World Championship, Red Bull KTM Ajo Motorsport signed Gardner, and Raúl Fernández. The pair dominated the season, winning 13 out of the 18 races held that year. Gardner scored 5 race wins, 6 second places, and a third place, never finishing outside the top ten during the season, besides a crash in the USA. The championship came down to the last race in Valencia, but a tenth place finish saw Gardner crowned world champion, winning the title with 311 points, four points over teammate Fernández.

MotoGP World Championship

Tech3 KTM Factory Racing (2022) 
In September 2021, it was announced that both Gardner and Raúl Fernández would step up to the premier class for the 2022 MotoGP World Championship, riding for the KTM Tech3 team.

In September, Gardner announced that he would be sacked from KTM at the end of the season, as he was told that he was "not professional enough", despite being ahead of teammate Fernández in the standings during that time.

Superbike World Championship

GRT Yamaha WorldSBK Team (from 2023) 
After Gardner was unable to find a seat for the 2023 MotoGP World Championship, he joined Yamaha for the 2023 Superbike World Championship.

Career statistics

FIM CEV Moto3 Junior World Championship

Races by year
(key) (Races in bold indicate pole position, races in italics indicate fastest lap)

FIM CEV Moto2 European Championship

Races by year
(key) (Races in bold indicate pole position, races in italics indicate fastest lap)

Grand Prix motorcycle racing

By season

By class

Races by year
(key) (Races in bold indicate pole position, races in italics indicate fastest lap)

Superbike World Championship

By season

Races by year
(key) (Races in bold indicate pole position) (Races in italics indicate fastest lap)

* Season still in progress.

References

External links

Australian motorcycle racers
Living people
1998 births
Moto3 World Championship riders
Moto2 World Championship riders
Motorcycle racers from Sydney
MotoGP World Championship riders
Tech3 MotoGP riders
Moto2 World Riders' Champions
Superbike World Championship riders